The Sueño MLS program is a Major League Soccer scouting program that looks for undiscovered talent. This program gives players the opportunity to be selected to join the elite Youth Academy System of a host Major League Soccer club.

Synopsis
 
Sueño MLS is a nationally-televised player search for Major League Soccer, which focuses on Latin American talent throughout the United States. The name "Sueño MLS" is "MLS Dream" in Spanish, and tryouts are held in three select cities every year on a first-come basis. Hundreds of teenagers passionate about the sport travel from across the country to attend these free tryouts. Pro coaches from MLS teams are responsible for selecting what they believe to be the most talented players. Five field players and one goalkeeper are typically selected per participating city to compete for the Sueño MLS title. Eighteen finalists train together for a few days to face in a final match against an MLS Academy Team affiliated with an MLS franchise.

History
In 2011, 400 tryout spots were made available on the first day, and then the list of players was narrowed down to 30 for the second day of tryouts. Five outfield players and one goalkeeper were selected from each city, namely Chicago, Los Angeles, and Philadelphia.

The 2011 competition also included the first-ever award for the top goalkeeper of the competition titled the "Good Hands" Award.

The final was then held in Dallas, Texas where Birnis Adames was named the winner of the competition and Anthony Hall, the top goalkeeper, respectively.

Winners

Competition Winners

"Good Hands" Top Goalkeeper

References

Major League Soccer